Laura May Cook Ingram  (11 June 1912 – 6 December 1994) was a New Zealand teacher and community leader. She was born in Murchison, Nelson, New Zealand on 11 June 1912.

In the 1965 New Year Honours, Ingram was appointed a Member of the Order of the British Empire for services in the fields of community welfare and local government.

References

1912 births
1994 deaths
New Zealand educators
New Zealand Members of the Order of the British Empire
People from Murchison, New Zealand